Mount Edixon is a mountain,  high, located  southeast of Bowers Peak in the Lanterman Range, Bowers Mountains of Victoria Land, Antarctica. The topographical feature was so named by the northern party of the New Zealand Geological Survey Antarctic Expedition, 1963–64, for Lieutenant Commander James R. Edixon, a pilot with U.S. Navy Squadron VX-6, who, with considerable willingness and skill, was responsible for the expedition's air support. The mountain lies situated on the Pennell Coast, a portion of Antarctica lying between Cape Williams and Cape Adare.

External links 

 Mount Edixon on USGS website
 Mount Edixon on the Antarctica New Zealand Digital Asset Manager website
 Mount Edixon on AADC website
 Mount Edixon on SCAR website
 Mount Edixon on peakery website

References 

Mountains of Victoria Land
Pennell Coast